Plectroglyphidodon imparipennis is a species of damselfish in the family Pomacentridae. It is found in the Indo-Pacific.

Adults can grow up to  TL.

Distribution and habitat
This species of fish is found in the Indo-Pacific form eastern Africa to the Line Islands and Pitcairn Islands north to the Philippines and the Ryukyu Islands.

Description
Adults of this species can grow up to  TL. This fish is white in colouration with a yellow caudal fin. Its dorsal fin has 12 spines and 14 to 15 soft rays. Its anal fin has 2 spines and 11 to 12 soft rays.

Ecology

Diet
This fish feeds on benthic algae and invertebrates.

Behaviour
Adults stay close to their shelter.

References

imparipennis
Fish described in 1875